Peristasis (Ancient Greek: περίστασις "standing around") may refer to:

Peristasis (architecture)
Peristasis, inactive phases of vasoconstriction in inflammation
Peristasi, Pieria
The Greek name of Şarköy